Brothertown is an unincorporated community located in the town of Brothertown, Calumet County, Wisconsin, United States.

History
It was originally settled by the Brothertown Indians under the name Eeyamquittoowauconnuck. The tribe gave up its federal recognition in order to avoid relocation and much of the land was eventually settled by German immigrants.

Images

References

Unincorporated communities in Calumet County, Wisconsin
Unincorporated communities in Wisconsin